Richard Clement Moody  Knight Grand Cross of the Order of Military Merit of France (13 February 1813 – 31 March 1887) was a British governor, engineer, architect and soldier. He is best known for being the founder and the first Lieutenant-Governor of British Columbia, being the Commanding Executive Officer of Malta during the Crimean War and being the first British Governor of the Falkland Islands.

Moody, who is considered to be the founding father of British Columbia, founded the Colony of British Columbia, after he was selected to 'found a second England on the shores of the Pacific' by Sir Edward Bulwer-Lytton, who desired to send to the nascent colony 'representatives of the best of British culture' who had 'courtesy, high breeding, and urbane knowledge of the world'. The British Government considered Moody to be the definitive 'English gentleman and British Officer'.  Moody's official title was Commander of the Royal Engineers, Columbia Detachment, Chief Commissioner of Lands and Works for British Columbia, and first Lieutenant-Governor of British Columbia. Moody founded the capital of British Columbia, New Westminster, and has been described as 'the real father of New Westminster'. He also established the Cariboo Road and Stanley Park, and named Burnaby Lake after his secretary Robert Burnaby and Port Coquitlam's 400-foot 'Mary Hill' after his wife, Mary Hawks. He also designed the first Coat of Arms of British Columbia. Port Moody in British Columbia, and Moody Park and Moody Square in New Westminster, are named after him.

He was also the first Governor of the Falkland Islands, and founded their settlements, including their capital Port Stanley. Moody Brook in the Falkland Islands is named after him. Moody Point in Antarctica is also named after him.

Moody was a polymath who excelled in engineering, and in architecture, and in music, and in science. He planned the restoration of Edinburgh Castle using musical chords, for which he was summoned to Windsor Castle for commendation by Queen Victoria and Prince Albert. He has been described as 'a visionary in a plain land' and 'a man who could conceive of Edinburgh Castle in terms of a musical score'.

Birth and ancestry

Richard Clement Moody was born, on 13 February 1813, at St. Ann's Garrison, Barbados. He was the third of ten children of Colonel Thomas Moody, Kt., who was of an influential British family, and of Martha Clement (1784 - 1868), who was the daughter of the Dutch landowner Richard Clement (1754 - 1829), after whom Richard Clement Moody was named, and through whom he was related to the cricketers Reynold Clement and Richard Clement. Richard Clement Moody's siblings included Major Thomas Moody (1809 - 1839); and James Leith Moody (1816 -1896), who was Chaplain to Royal Navy in China, and to the British Army in the Falkland Islands, and Gibraltar, and Malta, and Crimea; and Colonel Hampden Clement Blamire Moody CB (1821 - 1869), who was Commander of the Royal Engineers in China during the Second Opium War and the Taiping Rebellion; and Shute Barrington Moody (b. 1818) . His paternal grandmother was Barbara Blamire of Cumberland who was a cousin of the MP William Blamire and of the poet Susanna Blamire.

Education
 Richard Clement Moody was educated by private tutors before he enrolled, when he was aged 14 years, in the Royal Military Academy, Woolwich, at which he was a Gentleman Cadet who became Head of School in his second year and graduated in his third year. Like his father, and like his brother Hampden Clement Blamire Moody, Richard Clement Moody was a polymath who excelled in engineering, and in architecture, and in music, and in science. He planned the restoration of Edinburgh Castle using musical chords.

Overview of military and civil career
Richard Clement trained on the Ordnance Survey in 1829, and he was commissioned as a Second Lieutenant in the Royal Engineers in 1830. He was promoted to Lieutenant 1835, to Second Captain in 1844, to Captain in 1847, to Lieutenant-Colonel in 1855, to Colonel in 1858, and to Major-General in 1866.

Moody served with the Ordnance Survey in Ireland from 1832 to 1833.
He served on St. Vincent from October 1833 to September 1837, and, subsequently, on a tour the United States, with Sir Charles Felix Smith, from 1837 to 1838. On his return from the USA, Moody was stationed at Devonport. Moody served as Professor of Fortifications at Royal Military Academy, Woolwich from July 1838 to October 1841.

Moody was in October 1841 appointed Lieutenant-Governor of the Falkland-Islands: this office was renamed Governor of the Falkland Islands in 1843, when he also became Commander-in-Chief of the Falkland Islands. He served in these offices until July 1848, when he left Stanley, and arrived in England in February 1849. Moody in 1848 received the Knight Grand Cross of the Order of Military Merit of France.

He served as an aide-de-camp to the British Colonial Office, on special service, from August 1849. He served at Chatham Dockyard and at Plymouth during 1851. Moody was appointed Commanding Royal Engineer of Newcastle-upon-Tyne in 1852, as which he served until 1854. Moody was Executive Officer at Malta, during 1854, during the Crimean War, but was compelled to resign from this post in May 1855 as a consequence of insufficient health. He toured Germany before his appointment as Commander of the Royal Engineers in Scotland in November 1855.

Moody was appointed the Commander of the Royal Engineers, Columbia Detachment; the Chief Commissioner of Lands and Works for British Columbia; and the first Lieutenant-Governor of British Columbia, from December 1858 to July 1863.

Moody arrived in England, from British Columbia, in December 1863. He was Commanding Royal Engineer at Chatham Dockyard between March 1864 and 1866. as which he served until January 1866. On 25 January 1866, he was promoted to Major-General, and he retired from the British Army, on full pay, later that month. Moody then served as a Municipal Commissioner, and expended his time between the learned societies of which he was a member.

Moody was elected an Associate of the Institution of Civil Engineers on 23 April 1839, and was therefore one of its oldest members. He was also a Fellow of the Royal Geographical Society, and a Member of the Royal Agricultural Society, and an Honorary Associate of the Royal Institute of British Architects. Moody in 1848 received the Knight Grand Cross of the Order of Military Merit of France.

Moody during his retirement lived at Caynham Court, Ludlow, Shropshire and later at Fairfield House, Charmouth, Lyme Regis. His friends included the politician and novelist Sir Edward Bulwer-Lytton, and the biologist Sir Joseph Dalton Hooker. Richard Clement Moody died at the Royal Bath Hotel, Bournemouth on 31 March 1887, whilst visiting Bournemouth with his daughter, and was buried at St Peter's Church, Bournemouth. He was not able to fulfil his intention to return to British Columbia. He left over £24,000 in money, a vast sum in the Victorian age, in addition to his estates.

Governor of the Falkland Islands (October 1841 – July 1848)

Settlement
In 1833 the United Kingdom asserted authority over the Falkland Islands. In 1841, Moody, aged only 28 years, was appointed, on the recommendation of Lord Vivian, to be the first Lieutenant-Governor of the Falkland Islands. It is likely that the illustrious reputation, at the Colonial Office, of Richard Clement Moody's father, Colonel Thomas Moody, Kt., contributed to the Office's decision to appoint him to such an important position at an unprecedentedly young age, and, furthermore, to grant him powers that were exceptional even relative to those possessed by other colonial Governors. Richard Clement Moody departed England, for Falkland, on 1 October 1841. This post was renamed Governor of the Falkland Islands in 1843, when Richard Clement also became Commander-in-Chief of the Falkland Islands. Moody was directed by Lord John Russell to exercise an authority of 'influence, persuasion, and example'. Moody left England, for Falkland, on 9 October 1842. When Moody arrived, on board the Hebe, at Port Louis on 16 January 1842, the Falklands was 'almost in a state of anarchy', but he used his powers 'with great wisdom and moderation' to develop the Islands' infrastructure.

During his first years on the Islands, Moody's only social equal was his secretary, Murrell Robinson Robinson [sic], a surveyor and engineer, who was the nephew of one of Moody's tutors. Moody appointed Robinson as a JP in 1843. However, Moody and Robinson had an altercation in March 1845 in which Moody banished Murrell from the Islands, telling Robinson to set out 'axe in hand' for some other colony.

Moody completed a comprehensive General Report of the Falkland Islands for the British Government: it was completed on 14 April 1842 and was sent to London on 3 May. In his General Report, Moody recommended that the Government encourage settlers and promote extensive sheep farming. He estimated the population of sheep to be 40,000 in 1842 and encouraged the Government to import quality stock from Britain to be crossed with the local breeds: this policy was implemented to considerable success and was adopted by future settlers.

The botanist Joseph Dalton Hooker, who arrived on the Islands with the expedition of Sir James Clark Ross, described Moody as 'a very active and intelligent young man, most anxious to improve the colony and gain every information [sic] respecting its products'. Moody granted Hooker full use of his personal library, which Hooker described as 'excellent', and the two developed a close friendship.

Moody's refusal to acquiesce to George Thomas Whitington's attempt to force Moody to travel to the Falkland Islands in Whitington's brig Alarm provoked a feud between the Moody family and the Whitington family (the latter of which included John Bull Whitington in the Falkland Islands) that continued throughout Moody's tenure as Governor of the Falkland Islands. Whitington criticised Moody in the Colonial Magazine of November 1844.

The Foundation of Stanley
Almost directly after Moody's arrival in 1842 the Antarctic Expedition of Sir James Clark Ross sailed into Port Louis. Ross advised Moody that he should choose for his capital a site that was more easily accessible to sailing ships than Port Louis. Moody followed his advice and investigated the suitability of Port William, which had been recommended by Lord John Russell, which Moody concluded to be the best site for the new capital of the Falkland Islands. He renamed the site Port Stanley after Lord Stanley, Secretary of State for War and the Colonies, and founded and developed the city, to which he moved his administration moved in 1845. Moody designed Government House in Stanley, although his design was only completed in 1850, one year after he had returned to England.
Sir James Ross subsequently named Moody Point, off Joinville Island in Antarctica, after Richard Clement Moody.

In Falkland, Moody levied a tax on alcohol, without any authorisation from London, and, because there was a lack of currency on the island, issued his own currency, of promissory notes, also without authorisation from London. Both measures resolved immediate problems on the Islands, but Moody was criticized in Parliament, by Sir William Molesworth, 8th Baronet, for the latter.

In June 1843, when Moody's office was renamed 'Governor' (from Lieutenant-Governor), Moody was instructed by the Colonial Office to establish a colonial administration with a Legislative Council and an Executive Council. The records of Moody’s  'conscientious' and 'impressive' administration of Falkland are held in the Jane Cameron National Archives in Stanley.

Moody enacted laws, collected duties and taxes, and enforced order. He asked the British authorities for a doctor, a magistrate, and a chaplain: all three were dispatched, the latter being Richard Clement’s brother, James Leith Moody, who arrived in October 1845, proved himself to be 'querulous and eccentric', and engaged in a feud with his brother. Richard Clement established residences, Government offices, a barracks, a new road system, docks, a court of law, a gaol, a school, a church, a graveyard, and a police force. He established the requested Executive Council and a Legislative Council in 1845, each consisting of British officials, merchants, and local landowners. Moody's activities were impeded by the incompetence of several members of his administration, and he dismissed several of them. When during 1846 Moody's father Thomas was posted, from the Colonial Office, to Guernsey, and Henry Grey, 3rd Earl Grey became Secretary of State for War and the Colonies, the Colonial Office became less sympathetic to Moody.

Moody repudiated the original settlers of the Islands, but praised his Royal Engineers: he wrote, our community... chiefly composed of men of the lowest class, formerly seamen in whale ships & sealers, foreigners and Spanish gauchos... the only persons opposed to such wretched material for the formation of a colony are the 5 or 6 gentlemen and the detachment of Royal Sappers and Miners.

Militia
In 1845, animosity on the River Plate between the British and the French fleets and the Argentine Government of Juan Manuel de Rosas provoked Moody to request an artillery contingent from Britain and to raise his own militia using his Royal Engineers to train the local population. In 1891, the militia founded by Moody was renamed the Falkland Islands Volunteer Force: it was later renamed again to the Falkland Islands Defence Force, and it saw action in both World Wars and during the Argentine invasion of the Falkland Islands in 1982, when, coincidentally, one of the focal points of the Argentine offensive was Moody Brook, named after Richard Clement.

Permanent infrastructure
Moody’s authority provoked antipathy in his subordinates, especially his inequable brother James Leith, the Chaplain to the British Force in the Islands. However, from the perspective of the British Government, Richard Clement Moody's tenure was a success, the consequence of which has been 180 years of British administration of the islands.

In 1994, to mark the 150th anniversary of the founding of Stanley, Moody, together with James Clark Ross and Lord Stanley, was commemorated on the Falkland Islands stamps issued. Government House in Stanley, which was designed by Moody, featured on the stamps issued in 1933, to commemorate the Centenary, on those issued in 1983, to commemorate 150 years of British administration of the Islands, and on those issued in 1996 to commemorate the visit, in January of that year, by Princess Anne. Moody Brook is named after Richard Clement.

In 1845 Moody introduced tussock grass into Great Britain from Falkland, for which he received the gold medal of the Royal Agricultural Society. Moody wrote an account of tussock grass in the Journal of the Royal Agricultural Society (IV.17, V.50,VII.73). The Coat of arms of the Falkland Islands notably includes an image of tussock grass.

Moody left the Falkland Islands, for England, on HM Transport Nautilus, in July 1848. Moody arrived in England in February 1849.

Britain and Malta (February 1849 - October 1858)
Moody in 1848 received the Knight Grand Cross of the Order of Military Merit of France. He served as an aide-de-camp to the British Colonial Office, on special service, from August 1849. During this period, Richard Clement tended to his father, Colonel Thomas Moody, Kt.

Richard Clement Moody served at Chatham Dockyard and at Plymouth during 1851. Moody was appointed Commanding Royal Engineer of Newcastle-upon-Tyne in 1852, as which he served until 1854. During Moody's appointment in this position, a great reservoir at Holmfirth, Yorkshire, burst, on 5 February 1852, and destroyed life and property, and Moody was employed to direct the relief effort and to inspect the other reservoirs in the district. Moody was promoted to Regimental Colonel on 8 December 1853.

Moody was appointed Executive Officer of Malta, during 1854, during the Crimean War. Whilst at Malta, his eldest son, Richard Stanley Hawks Moody, later a distinguished Colonel in the British Army, was born, on 23 October 1854, at Strada Reale, Valletta. However, Richard Clement Moody was compelled by his Yellow Fever to resign from his post in May 1855. 

He toured Germany before his appointment as Commander of the Royal Engineers in Scotland in November 1855, as which he served until October 1858. Moody was in Scotland involved in architectural projects, and enjoyed the intellectual society of Edinburgh where he met some of the most learned men of Scotland in science and in the arts.

Musical Plan for Edinburgh Castle and Queen Victoria
Whilst in Germany, after his resignation from his office at Malta, Moody composed plans for the restoration of Edinburgh Castle that were based on a musical architectural principle in which measurements were made 'drawn to musical chords'. He has been described as 'a visionary in a plain land' and 'a man who could conceive of Edinburgh Castle in terms of a musical score'.< His plans so impressed Lord Panmure that he was invited to Windsor Castle to present them to Queen Victoria and Prince Albert, both of whom were talented musicians and both of whom were delighted. The implementation of Moody's plans was disrupted by the retirement of Lord Panmure and they were never implemented. They are retained at the War Office, where 'they still remain a memorial to Moody's talent'.

Founder and first Lieutenant-Governor of British Columbia (October 1858 - July 1863)

Selection

When news of the Fraser Canyon Gold Rush reached London, Sir Edward Bulwer-Lytton, Secretary of State for the Colonies, requested that War Office recommend a field officer who were 'a man of good judgement possessing a knowledge of mankind' to lead a Corps of 150 (later increased to 172) Royal Engineers who had been selected for their 'superior discipline and intelligence'. The War Office chose Moody: and Lord Lytton, who described Moody as his 'distinguished friend', accepted their nomination, as a consequence of Moody's military record, his success as Governor of the Falkland Islands, and the distinguished record of his father, Colonel Thomas Moody, Knight, at the Colonial Office. Moody was charged to establish British order and to transform the new Colony of British Columbia (1858–66) into the British Empire's 'bulwark in the farthest west' and 'found a second England on the shores of the Pacific'. Lytton desired to send to the colony 'representatives of the best of British culture, not just a police force': men who possessed 'courtesy, high breeding and urbane knowledge of the world' such as Moody, whom the Government considered to be the archetypal 'English gentleman and British Officer' to command the Royal Engineers, Columbia Detachment. Moody's brother, Colonel Hampden Clement Blamire Moody, had already served with the Royal Engineers in British Columbia, from 1840 to 1848, to such success that he was subsequently granted command of the Regiment across the entirety of China. 

Richard Clement Moody and his wife Mary Hawks (of the Hawks industrial dynasty and of the Boyd merchant banking family) and their four children left England, for British Columbia, in October 1858, and arrived in British Columbia in December 1858, with the 172 Royal Engineers of the Royal Engineers, Columbia Detachment, and his secretary the freemason Robert Burnaby (after whom he subsequently named Burnaby Lake), under his command. The original Columbia Detachment consisted of 150 Royal Engineers, both sappers and officers, before it was increased to 172. Moody had three Captains: Robert Mann Parsons, John Marshall Grant, and Henry Reynolds Luard. The contingent included two Lieutenants, both of British landed gentry, namely Lieutenant Arthur Reid Lempriere (of Diélament, Jersey) and Lieutenant Henry Spencer Palmer, and Doctor John Vernon Seddall, and Captain William Driscoll Gosset (who was to be Colonial Treasurer and Commissary Officer), and The Rev. John Sheepshanks (who was to be Chaplain of the Columbia Detachment). Moody was sworn in as the first Lieutenant-Governor of British Columbia and appointed Chief Commissioner of Lands and Works for British Columbia.

Ned McGowan's War
Moody had hoped to begin immediately the foundation of a capital city, but on his arrival at Fort Langley, he learned of an insurrection, at the settlement of Hill's Bar, by a notorious outlaw, Ned McGowan, and some restive gold miners. Moody repressed the rebellion, which became popularly known as 'Ned McGowan's War', without loss of life. Moody described the incident:

The notorious Ned McGowan, of Californian celebrity at the head of a band of Yankee Rowdies defying the law! Every peaceable citizen frightened out of his wits!—Summons & warrants laughed to scorn! A Magistrate seized while on the Bench, & brought to the Rebel's camp, tried, condemned, & heavily fined! A man shot dead shortly before! Such a tale to welcome me at the close of a day of great enjoyment.

Moody described the response to his success: 'They gave me a Salute, firing off their loaded Revolvers over my head—Pleasant—Balls whistling over one's head! as a compliment! Suppose a hand had dropped by accident!  I stood up, & raised my cap & thanked them in the Queen's name for their loyal reception of me'.

The Foundation of New Westminster
In British Columbia, Moody 'wanted to build a city of beauty in the wilderness' and planned his city as an iconic visual metaphor for British dominance, 'styled and located with the objective of reinforcing the authority of the Crown and of the robe'. Subsequent to the enactment of the Pre-emption Act of 1860, Moody settled the Lower Mainland. He founded the new capital city, New Westminster, at a site of dense forest of Douglas pine that he selected for its strategic excellence including the quality of its port. He, in his letter to his friend Arthur Blackwood of the Colonial Office that is dated 1 February 1859, described the majestic beauty of the site:

"The entrance to the Frazer is very striking--Extending miles to the right & left are low marsh lands (apparently of very rich qualities) & yet fr the Background of Superb Mountains- Swiss in outline, dark in woods, grandly towering into the clouds there is a sublimity that deeply impresses you. Everything is large and magnificent, worthy of the entrance to the Queen of England's dominions on the Pacific mainland. [...] My imagination converted the silent marshes into Cuyp-like pictures of horses and cattle lazily fattening in rich meadows in a glowing sunset. [...] The water of the deep clear Frazer was of a glassy stillness, not a ripple before us, except when a fish rose to the surface or broods of wild ducks fluttered away".

Moody designed the roads and the settlements of New Westminster, and his Royal Engineers, under Captain John Marshall Grant, built an extensive road network, including that which became Kingsway, which connected New Westminster to False Creek; and the North Road between Port Moody and New Westminster; and the Pacific terminus, at Burrard's Inlet, of Port Moody, of the Canadian and Pacific Railway (which subsequently was extended to the mouth of the Inlet and terminates now at Vancouver); and the Cariboo Road; and Stanley Park, which was an important strategic area for invaluable the eventuality of an invasion by America. He named Burnaby Lake after his secretary Robert Burnaby, and he named Port Coquitlam's 400-foot 'Mary Hill' after his wife Mary Hawks. Moody designed the first Coat of arms of British Columbia. Richard Clement Moody established Port Moody, which was subsequently named after him, at the end of the trail that connected New Westminster with Burrard Inlet, to defend New Westminster from potential attack from the United States. Moody also established a town at Hastings which was later incorporated into Vancouver. 

The British designated multiple tracts as government reserves. The Pre-emption Act did not specify conditions for the distribution of the land, and, consequently, large areas were bought by speculators. Moody requisitioned 3,750 acres (sc. 1,517 hectares) for himself, and, on this land, he subsequently built for himself, and owned, Mayfield, a model farm near New Westminster. Moody was criticised by journalists for land grabbing, but his requisitions were ordered by the Colonial Office, and Moody throughout his tenure in British Columbia received the approbation of the British authorities in London, and was in British Columbia described as 'the real father of New Westminster'. However, Lord Lytton, then Secretary of State for the Colonies, 'forgot the practicalities of paying for clearing and developing the site and the town' and the efforts of Moody's Engineers were continually impeded by insufficient funds, which, together with the continuous opposition of Governor Douglas, 'made it impossible for [Moody's] design to be fulfilled'.

Moody's 5th, 6th, and 7th children, all daughters, were born at Government House in New Westminster. He is thought to have also fathered at least two illegitimate children with his Native American housekeeper.

The Feud with Governor Douglas
Throughout his tenure in British Columbia, Moody feuded with Sir James Douglas Governor of Vancouver Island, whose jurisdiction overlapped with his own. Moody's offices of Chief Commissioner and Lieutenant-Governor were of 'higher prestige [and] lesser authority' than that of Douglas, despite Moody's superior social position in the judgement of the Royal Engineers and of the British Government which had selected Moody to 'out manoeuvre the old Hudson's Bay Factor [Governor Douglas]'. Moody had been selected by Lord Lytton for his qualities of the archetypal 'English gentleman and British Officer', and because his family was 'eminently respectable': he was the son of Colonel Thomas Moody, Kt., who owned land in the islands in which Douglas's father owned less land and from which Douglas's 'a half-breed' mother originated. Governor Douglas's ethnicity was 'an affront to Victorian society', whereas Mary Moody was a member of the Hawks industrial dynasty and of the Boyd merchant banking family. Mary Moody wrote, on 4 August 1859, 'it is not pleasant to serve under a Hudson's Bay Factor', and that the 'Governor and Richard can never get on'. John Robson, who was the editor of the British Columbian, wanted Richard Clement Moody's office to include that of Governor of British Columbia, and to thereby make obsolete Douglas. In letter to the Colonial Office of 27 December 1858, Richard Clement Moody states that he has 'entirely disarmed [Douglas] of all jealously'. Douglas repeatedly insulted the Royal Engineers by attempting to assume their command and refusing to acknowledge their contribution to the nascent colony.

Margaret A. Ormsby, who was the author of the Dictionary of Canadian Biography entry for Moody (2002), unpopularly censures Moody for the abortive development of the New Westminster. However, most significant historians commend Moody's contribution and exonerate Moody from culpability for the abortive development of New Westminster, especially with regard to the perpetual insufficiency of funds and of the personally motivated opposition by Douglas that continually retarded the development of British Columbia. Robert Burnaby observed that Douglas proceeded with 'muddling [Moody's] work and doubling his expenditure' and with employing administrators to 'work a crooked policy against Moody' to 'retard British Columbia and build up... the stronghold of Hudson's Bay interests' and their own 'landed stake'. Therefore, Robert Edgar Cail, Don W. Thomson, Ishiguro, and Scott commended Moody for his contribution, and Scott accused Ormsby of being 'adamant in her dislike of Colonel Moody' despite the majority of evidence, and almost all other biographies of Moody, including that by the Institution of Civil Engineers, and that by the Royal Engineers, and that by the British Columbia Historical Association, commend Moody's achievements in British Columbia.

The Royal Engineers, Columbia Detachment was disbanded in July 1863. The Moody family (which now consisted of Moody, and his wife, and seven legitimate children) and the 22 Royal Engineers who wished to return to England, who had 8 wives between them, departed for England. 130 of the original Columbia Detachment decided to remain in British Columbia. Scott contends that the dissolution of the Columbia Detachment, and the consequent departure of Moody, 'doomed' the development of the settlement and the realisation of Lord Lytton's dream. A vast congregation of New Westminster citizens gathered at the dock to bid farewell to Moody as his boat departed for England. Moody wanted to return to British Columbia, but he died before he was able to do so. Moody left his library behind, in New Westminster, to become the public library of New Westminster.

In April 1863, the Councillors of New Westminster decreed that 20 acres should be reserved and named Moody Square after Richard Clement Moody. The area around Moody Square that was completed only in 1889 has also been named Moody Park after Moody. Numerous developments occurred in and around Moody Park, including Century House, which was opened by Princess Margaret on 23 July 1958. In 1984, on the occasion of the 125th anniversary of New Westminster, a monument of Richard Clement Moody, at the entrance of the park, was unveiled by Mayor Tom Baker. For Moody's achievements in the Falkland Islands and in British Columbia, British diplomat David Tatham CMG, who served as Governor of the Falkland Islands, described Moody as an 'Empire builder'. In January 2014, with the support of the Friends of the British Columbia Archives and of the Royal British Columbia Museum Foundation, The Royal British Columbia Museum purchased a photograph album that had belonged to Richard Clement Moody. The album contains over 100 photographs of the early settlement of British Columbia, including some of the earliest known photographs of First Nations peoples.

Marriage and issue 
On 6 July 1852, at St Andrew's Church, Newcastle upon Tyne, Moody married Mary Susannah Hawks of the Hawks industrial dynasty, who was the daughter of the merchant banker Joseph Hawks JP DL Sheriff of Newcastle, and of Mary Boyd of the Boyd merchant banking family. Mary Hawks's maternal uncles included Admiral Benedictus Marwood Kelly and industrialist Edward Fenwick Boyd. After their marriage, Richard and Mary Moody embarked on a Grand Tour of Europe, including of France, and of Switzerland, and of Germany.

Richard Clement Moody named the 400-foot hill in Port Coquitlam, British Columbia, 'Mary Hill', after his wife. However, Mary Moody disliked British Columbia, and described living there as 'roughing it in the bush' relative to living in England. The Royal British Columbia Museum has 42 letters written by Mary Moody from the British Empire, mostly from the Colony of British Columbia (1858–66), to her mother and to her sister, Emily Hawks, who were in England. Mary Moody was highly erudite in English and in French literature, and her letters were of interest to scholars of British families during the Victorian period. 
Moody and Mary Hawks had 13 children. Moody is thought to have also fathered at least two illegitimate children with his Native American housekeeper whom he left in British Columbia. The 13 children of Moody and Mary Hawks were:

 Josephine ('Zeffie') Mary (b. 1853, Newcastle, d. 1923). A fabric embroiderer of Fisherton de la Mere. Married Arthur Newall, who was a son of Robert Stirling Newall, in 1883, by whom she had two sons: namely Robert Stanley  (b. 1884), who was an archaeologist for the Commissioners of Woods and Forests, and who made excavations at Stonehenge with William Hawley; and Basil (b. 1885).
 Colonel Richard S. Hawks Moody CB Military Knight of Windsor (b. 1854, Valetta, Malta - d. 1930, Windsor Castle). Married Mary Latimer, 1881, by whom he had four children. His eldest daughter, Mary Latimer, married the military surgeon Major-General James Fitzgerald Martin KStJ. His youngest daughter, Barbara Bindon, married the choral conductor James W. Webb-Jones.
 Charles Edmund (b. 1856, Edinburgh). Attended Cheltenham College. Businessman. Married Kate Ellershaw in 1885, by whom he had three daughters, the eldest of whom, Kathleen (b. 1886) married Sir Donald Kingdon, Chief Justice of the Gold Coast.
 Walter Clement (b. 1858, Edinburgh, d. 1936). Married Laura Rynd in 1888.
 Susan (b. 1860, Government House, New Westminster, British Columbia, d. 1940).
 Mary (b. 1861 Government House, New Westminster, British Columbia, d. 1938).
 Margaret (b. 1863, Government House, New Westminster, British Columbia). Married The Rev. Richard Lowndes in 1887, with whom she had two sons and two daughters.
 Captain Henry de Clervaux (b. 1864, d. 13 December 1900, killed in action at Battle of Nooitgedacht, Second Boer War). He was named after his ancestor William Clervaux of Croft, from whom he descended through Sir William Chaytor. He attended Rugby School and Royal Military Academy, Sandhurst. He served, between 1885 and 1887, in the Burmese Expedition with the 2nd Battaltion the Queen's Own Royal West Kent Regiment, for which he received the medal with clasp. He served in the Second Boer War as aide-de-camp to Major-General Clements, who was the Commander of the 12th Infantry Brigade, and he was mentioned in despatches on 10 September 1901. Married Daisy Leighton by whom he did not have issue. He is buried at Krugersdorp Garden of Remembrance, in South Africa, and commemorated at Hereford Cathedral.
 Grace (b. 1865, d. 1947).
 Gertrude (b. 1869, d. 1914).
 Major George Robert Boyd (b. 1865, d. 1936). Married Dorothy Wingfield. His daughter Rosemary Moody (1903 - 1982) married Richard Edward Holford (1909 - 1983), who was the son of Captain Charles Frederick Holford , on 10 August 1935.
 Ruth and Rachel (Twins b. 20 April 1870, d. (both) 21 April 1870).

References

Notes

Sources

 
 
 
 

 
 
 

1813 births
1887 deaths
Academics of the Royal Military Academy, Woolwich
Burials in Dorset
People from Bridgetown
Graduates of the Royal Military Academy, Woolwich
Royal Engineers officers
Recipients of the Order of Military Merit (France)
British Army generals
Governors of the Falkland Islands
Colony of British Columbia (1858–1866) people
Lieutenant Governors of British Columbia
English explorers
English surveyors
British explorers of North America
Explorers of British Columbia
History of the Pacific Northwest
Interior of British Columbia
Edinburgh Castle
British colonial governors and administrators in the Americas
Fellows of the Institution of Civil Engineers
Fellows of the Royal Geographical Society